This is a list of municipalities that have the Quebec municipal type of parish municipality (paroisse, code=P), an administrative division defined by the Ministry of Municipal Affairs, Regions and Land Occupancy.

The Commission de toponymie du Québec describes a parish municipality (municipalité de paroisse) as "the territory of a parish (in the religious sense) established as a municipality" . Many of these remain from the days in which the Catholic Church served as an effective governmental structure in areas without established secular municipal government.

In most cases, these are rural, sparsely inhabited areas; in a few cases (such as Notre-Dame-des-Anges and Saint-Louis-de-Gonzague-du-Cap-Tourmente), they are divisions created originally to give special municipal independence to certain church installations.

Parish municipalities

External links 
 MAMH Répertoire des municipalités

Quebec

Parish municipalities in Quebec, List of